The North Saskatchewan Regiment (N Sask R) is a Primary Reserve infantry regiment of the Canadian Army, headquartered in Saskatoon, Saskatchewan, with companies in Saskatoon and Prince Albert. Its current commanding officer is Lieutenant-Colonel Dennis Sansom, and the regimental sergeant-major is Chief Warrant Officer Jason Balcaen. The N Sask R is part of the 3rd Canadian Division's 38 Canadian Brigade Group.

Perpetuations

North-West Rebellion
The Moose Mountain Scouts
The Infantry Company, Battleford, Saskatchewan

The Great War
The Canadian Light Horse
1st Battalion, Canadian Mounted Rifles, CEF
9th Regiment, Canadian Mounted Rifles, CEF
10th Regiment, Canadian Mounted Rifles, CEF
5th Battalion (Western Cavalry), CEF
53rd Battalion (Northern Saskatchewan), CEF
65th Battalion (Saskatchewan), CEF
232nd Battalion (Saskatchewan), CEF

Operational history

North-West Rebellion
The Moose Mountain Scouts were raised for active service on 24 April 1885 and served with the Line of Communication Troops of the North West Field Force until disbanded on 18 September 1885.

The Infantry Company at Battleford was raised for active service on 10 April 1885, and served with the Battleford Column of the North-West Field Force. It was disbanded on 18 September 1885.

The Great War
The 1st Battalion, Canadian Mounted Rifles, CEF was authorized on 7 November 1914 and embarked for Great Britain on 12 June 1915. It disembarked in France on 22 September 1915, where it fought as part of the 1st Brigade, Canadian Mounted Rifles, until 1 January 1916. The Battalion was converted to infantry, and allocated to the 8th Infantry Brigade, 3rd Canadian Division. The Battalion fought in France and Flanders until the end of the Great War.

The 9th Regiment, Canadian Mounted Rifles was authorized on 7 November 1914 and embarked for Great Britain on 23 November 1915. There, its personnel were absorbed by the Canadian Cavalry Reserve Depot, CEF, the 1st Battalion, Canadian Mounted Rifles, CEF and the 5th Battalion, Canadian Mounted Rifles, CEF on 31 January 1916. The regiment disbanded on 15 November 1920.

The 10th Regiment, Canadian Mounted Rifles was authorized on 7 November 1914 and embarked for Great Britain on 28 April 1916. Its personnel were absorbed by the Canadian Cavalry Reserve Depot, CEF on 22 May 1916. The regiment was disbanded on 17 July 1917.

The 5th Battalion (Western Cavalry), CEF, was authorized on 10 August 1914 and embarked for Great Britain on 29 September 1915. It disembarked in France on 14 February 1915, where it fought as part of the 2nd Infantry Brigade, 1st Canadian Division in France and Flanders until the end of the war. The battalion disbanded on 15 September 1920.

The 53rd Battalion (Northern Saskatchewan), CEF was authorized on 7 November 1914 and embarked for Great Britain on 29 March 1916. It provided reinforcements for the Canadian Corps until it disbanded on 12 October 1917.

The 65th Battalion (Saskatchewan), CEF was authorized on 20 April 1915 and embarked for Great Britain on 18 June 1916. Its personnel were absorbed by various units of the 4th Canadian Division on 30 June 1916. The battalion was disbanded on 12 October 1917.

The 232nd (Saskatchewan) Battalion, CEF was authorized on 15 July 1916 and embarked for Great Britain on 18 April 1917. Its personnel were absorbed by the 15th Reserve Battalion, CEF on 29 April and 9 June 1917 to provide reinforcements for the Canadian Corps. The battalion was disbanded on 12 October 1917.

The Second World War
Details of The Prince Albert and Battleford Volunteers and The Saskatoon Light Infantry (Machine Gun) were called out on service on 26 August 1939 and then placed on active service on 1 September 1939 for local protection duties. These details were disbanded on 31 December 1940.

The 16th/22nd Saskatchewan Horse mobilized for active service on 24 May 1940. It was redesignated as the 20th Reconnaissance Battalion (16/22 Saskatchewan Horse), CAC, CASF, on 26 January 1942 and the 20th Army Tank Regiment (16/22 Saskatchewan Horse), CAC, CASF, on 15 May 1942. On 16 June 1943 it embarked for Great Britain, where it was disbanded on 1 November 1943.

The 1st Battalion, The Prince Albert Volunteers, CASF, mobilized on 5 March 1942. It served in Canada in a home defence role as part of the 15th Infantry Brigade, 7th Canadian Infantry Division and 19th Infantry Brigade, Pacific Command, and disbanded on 30 November 1945.

The Saskatoon Light Infantry (Machine Gun), CASF, mobilized for active service on 1 September 1939. It was redesignated as the 1st Battalion, The Saskatoon Light Infantry (Machine Gun), CASF, on 7 November 1940, then as the 1st Infantry Division Support Battalion (The Saskatoon Light Infantry), CIC, CASF, on 1 May 1943 and finally as the 1st Battalion, The Saskatoon Light Infantry (Machine Gun), CASF, on 1 July 1944. The battalion embarked for Great Britain on 8 December 1939. It participated in the expedition to raid the Norwegian island of Spitzbergen on 25 August 1941, landed in Sicily on 10 July and Italy on 3 September 1943 as part of the 1st Canadian Infantry Division. The unit landed in France on 4 March 1945, on its way to the North-West Europe theatre of operations in which it served until the end of the war. The overseas battalion was disbanded on 15 October 1945. On 1 June 1945 The Saskatoon Light Infantry (Machine Gun) mobilized three cannon companies for active service with the Canadian Army Pacific Force, which disbanded on 1 November 1945.

War In Afghanistan
The regiment contributed an aggregate of more than 20% of its authorized strength to the various Task Forces which served in Afghanistan between 2002 and 2014.

Battle honours
Battle honours in small capitals are for large operations and campaigns and those in lowercase are for more specific battles. Bold type indicates honours emblazoned on regimental colours.

One of these honours was gained by the regiment upon the amalgamations.

Lineage

The North Saskatchewan Regiment

Originated 3 July 1905 in Regina, Saskatchewan on 3 July 1905 as The 16th Mounted Rifles
Redesignated 1 October 1908 as the 16th Light Horse
Redesignated 15 March 1920 as the 16th Canadian Light Horse
Amalgamated 15 December 1936 with The Saskatchewan Mounted Rifles and redesignated as the 16th/22nd Saskatchewan Horse
Redesignated 7 November 1940 as the 16th/22nd Saskatchewan Horse (Reserve)
Converted 1 April 1941 to infantry and redesignated as the 2nd (Reserve) Battalion, 16th/22nd Saskatchewan Horse
Redesignated 1 May 1941 as the 2nd (Reserve) Battalion, The Battleford Light Infantry (16th/22nd Saskatchewan Horse)
Redesignated 15 September 1944 as The Battleford Light Infantry (16th/22nd Saskatchewan Horse) (Reserve)
Amalgamated 1 April 1946 with the 2nd (Reserve) Battalion, The Prince Albert Volunteers and redesignated as The Prince Albert and Battleford Volunteers
Amalgamated 1 September 1954 with the 50th Field Squadron, RCE, and redesignated as The Prince Albert and Battleford Volunteers (Machine Gun)
Amalgamated 17 February 1955 with The Saskatoon Light Infantry (Machine Gun) and redesignated as The North Saskatchewan Regiment (Machine Gun)
Redesignated 11 April 1958 as The North Saskatchewan Regiment
On 1 September 1970, the 1st Battalion, The North Saskatchewan Regiment (The Prince Albert and Battleford Volunteers) and the 2nd Battalion, The North Saskatchewan Regiment (The Saskatoon Light Infantry) were amalgamated.

The Saskatchewan Mounted Rifles

Originated 2 March 1908 in Lloydminster, Saskatchewan the Saskatchewan Light Horse
Redesignated 1 April 1908 as the 22nd Saskatchewan Light Horse
Redesignated 15 March 1920 as The Saskatchewan Mounted Rifles
Amalgamated 15 December 1936 with the 16th Canadian Light Horse

50th Field Squadron, RCE
Originated 5 June 1947 in Lloydminster, Saskatchewan
Amalgamated 1 September 1954 with The Prince Albert and Battleford Volunteers

105th Regiment (Saskatoon Fusiliers)

Originated 1 April 1912 Saskatoon, Saskatchewan as the 105th Regiment
Redesignated 16 September 1912 as the 105th Regiment Fusiliers
Redesignated 15 April 1914 as the 105th Regiment (Saskatoon Fusiliers)
Amalgamated 15 March 1920 with the 52nd Regiment Prince Albert Volunteers and redesignated as The North Saskatchewan Regiment
Reorganized on 15 May 1924 as four separate regiments: The Yorkton Regiment (now the 64th Field Battery, 10th Field Artillery Regiment, RCA); The Saskatoon Light Infantry; The Battleford Light Infantry and The Prince Albert Volunteers

The Prince Albert Volunteers

Originated 15 May 1924 by the reorganization of The North Saskatchewan Regiment as The Battleford Light Infantry and The Prince Albert Volunteers
Amalgamated 15 December 1936 and redesignated as The Prince Albert and Battleford Volunteers
Redesignated 1 May 1941 as The Prince Albert Volunteers
Redesignated 5 March 1942 as the 2nd (Reserve) Battalion, The Prince Albert Volunteers
Amalgamated 1 April 1946 with The Battleford Light Infantry (16th/22nd Saskatchewan Horse) (Reserve)

The Saskatoon Light Infantry (Machine Gun)

Originated 15 May 1924 by the reorganization of The North Saskatchewan Regiment as The Saskatoon Light Infantry
Amalgamated 15 December 1936 with C Company of the 12th Machine Gun Battalion, CMGC (now The Royal Regina Rifles) and redesignated as The Saskatoon Light Infantry (Machine Gun)
Redesignated 7 November 1940 as the 2nd (Reserve) Battalion, The Saskatoon Light Infantry (Machine Gun)
Redesignated 1 November 1945 as The Saskatoon Light Infantry (Machine Gun)
Amalgamated 17 February 1955 with The Prince Albert and Battleford Volunteers (Machine Gun) as reorganized as a two battalion unit with the 1st Battalion, The North Saskatchewan Regiment (The Prince Albert and Battleford Volunteers) (Machine Gun) and the 2nd Battalion, The North Saskatchewan Regiment (The Saskatoon Light Infantry) (Machine Gun) on the Reserve Force order of battle

52nd Regiment Prince Albert Volunteers

Originated January 1913 in Prince Albert, Saskatchewan as an "Infantry Corps, consisting of 8 companies." 
Designated 1 February 1913 as the 52nd Regiment Prince Albert Volunteers
Amalgamated 15 March 1920 with the 105th Regiment (Saskatoon Fusiliers)

|-
|style="text-align: left;"|
 class="wikitable"
+ Abbreviations used in the chart
-
! Abbreviation !! Phrase
-
 Bde  Brigade
-
 Bn  Battalion
-
 CAC  Canadian Armoured Corps
-
 CAPF  Canadian Army Pacific Force
-
 CASF  Canadian Active Service Force
-
 CEF  Canadian Expeditionary Force
-
 CIC  Canadian Infantry Corps
-
 CMGC  Canadian Machine Gun Corps
-
 Coy  Company
-
 Div.  Division
-
 Infy  Infantry
-
 MG  Machine Gun
-
 RCE  Royal Canadian Engineers
-
 Regt  Regiment
-
 Sqn  Squadron

Alliances
 - The Rifles

References

External links 
 

North Saskatchewan Regiment
Prince Albert, Saskatchewan
Organizations based in Saskatoon
Military units and formations of Saskatchewan
Military units and formations of Canada in World War II
Military units and formations established in 1905
1905 establishments in Canada